The Church of Jesus Christ of Latter-day Saints in the United Kingdom refers to the Church of Jesus Christ of Latter-day Saints (LDS Church) and its members in the United Kingdom. In 2019, the United Kingdom had the 2nd most LDS Church members per capita among countries in Europe, behind Portugal.

Church activity in the UK

The LDS Church opened its Mormon Helping Hands programme in Britain. The project runs off of donations and volunteer work from church members, and provides service in local communities by Latter-day Saints who live there.

In the summer of 2013, the United Kingdom hosted the first official church pageant outside of North America. Titled "Truth Will Prevail", it told the story of early missionary efforts in Britain. The pageant included 33 core cast members, 300 family cast, and a 150-voice choir.

Missions

Temples

On 7 September 1958 the London England Temple was dedicated by President David O. McKay.

On 7 June 1998 the Preston England Temple was dedicated by President Gordon B. Hinckley.

Membership statistics
Table shows LDS membership statistics as of 31 December 2011 for various regions and nations of the UK, along with British Crown Dependencies.

See also
The Church of Jesus Christ of Latter-day Saints in England
The Church of Jesus Christ of Latter-day Saints in Wales
The Church of Jesus Christ of Latter-day Saints in Scotland
The Church of Jesus Christ of Latter-day Saints in Ireland
The Church of Jesus Christ of Latter-day Saints in the Isle of Man
Religion in the United Kingdom

References

External links
 ComeUntoChrist.org Latter-day Saints Visitor site
 The Church of Jesus Christ of Latter-day Saints Official site

 
1837 establishments in the United Kingdom
Harold B. Lee Library-related Americana articles